The Good Man is a 2012 film by Phil Harrison starring Aidan Gillen. The film premiered at the 2012 Galway Film Fleadh.

Cast
 Aidan Gillen as Michael
 Kelly Campbell as Ciara
 Thabang Sidloyi as Sifiso
 Jonathan Harden as Stephen
 Lunathi Mampofu as Katleho
 Lutando Mthi as Walter
 Lalor Roddy as John

Plot
The film centres on two interconnecting story arcs taking place in Cape Town and Northern Ireland.

Production
Filming locations include Belfast and South Africa.

References

External links
 

2012 films
English-language Irish films
English-language South African films
2010s English-language films